Horace Pearson (6 April 1907 – unknown) was an English footballer who played as a goalkeeper. He played in the Football League First Division for Blackpool.

Personal life
Pearson was from a footballing family, with both his uncle, Hubert Pearson, and cousin, Harold Pearson playing for West Bromwich Albion.

References

1907 births
English footballers
Association football goalkeepers
Tamworth F.C. players
Nuneaton Borough F.C. players
Luton Town F.C. players
Blackpool F.C. players
Oldham Athletic A.F.C. players
Coventry City F.C. players
Newport County A.F.C. players
Barry Town United F.C. players
Bristol City F.C. players
Scarborough F.C. players
Year of death missing